Jimmy Wang (born in Jersey City) is a freelance video and film producer.

Professional life

Jimmy Wang is currently working as a freelance video producer, in addition to working on his first feature length narrative film.

In 2012, Wang directed "Underground Hip-hop in China," a 45-minute documentary following the story of MC Webber, one of the first Hip-hop 
rappers in China.  The documentary follows the lives of many of China's "post-90's generation," critically juxtaposing the experiences of young post Mao-millennials as they grapple for their place in the new China with their nouveau riche counterparts, or " 富二代" (fu er dai) as they are known in Chinese.  The documentary takes an insider look at the changing social landscape in Beijing through the eyes of its local urbanites, right as the largest urbanization in history floods China's cities with more and more outsiders.

The film's sociological importance lies in its illustration of how soft power and censorship in the mainland Chinese music industry have forced many young talented Chinese musicians and artists to either embrace talent companys' blend of censorship and commercialism completely, or remain underground in obscurity, and banned from performing, in many cases.  This choice has forced many young artists to adopt attitudes of self-censorship towards their own music and thought if they wish to remain relevant on a national level, or, conversely, remain underground, on the internet, in the shadows.

From 2005 until 2012, Wang worked as a video journalist in the Beijing bureau of The New York Times.  His short video news work has
appeared on Time.com, The Asia Society.org, and syndicated international television broadcasts, in addition to nytimes.com.

Wang got his MFA from New York University's Tisch School of the Arts in writing/directing.  He got his BA from Northwestern University.  
He is not Jimmy Wang Yang, the smack down wrestler, or Jimmy Wang Yu, the Kung-Fu choreographer

Past awards

Mr. Wang's documentaries have won awards, including, in 2009, the global media award for outstanding informational long form story at the International CES, organized by The National Academy of Television Arts and the Consumer Electronics Association (CEA) to promote new media models. Wang received the award for producing the videos in “Choking on Growth,” a 9-part documentary series about the environmental challenges facing China in the wake of its unprecedented economic growth.  Wang worked within a team of committed journalists and senior staff to produce the videos.  He also received the Grantham Prize for Excellence in Reporting on the Environment for the series.  For more information on past work and awards, see http://thejimmywang.com

Examples of journalism
http://video.nytimes.com/video/2008/05/23/world/1194817477927/tracking-chinas-missing.html?partner=permalink&exprod=permalink
http://video.nytimes.com/video/2008/05/24/world/1194817104011/chinese-ask-why-schools-crumbled.html?partner=permalink&exprod=permalink
http://video.nytimes.com/video/2008/02/27/arts/music/1194817096752/good-morning-pyongyang.html?partner=permalink&exprod=permalink
http://www.nytimes.com/2009/01/24/arts/music/24hiphop.html
http://www.nytimes.com/2008/12/26/business/worldbusiness/26yuan.html
http://www.nytimes.com/2008/07/25/world/asia/25pole.html
http://www.nytimes.com/2008/06/21/business/worldbusiness/21gas.html

References

External links
 Official website

Journalists from New York City
Living people
Northwestern University alumni
American film producers
American people of Chinese descent
Tisch School of the Arts alumni
Year of birth missing (living people)